Linnéa Darell, born 1945, is a Swedish Liberal People's Party politician. She was a member of the Riksdag from 2002 until 2006.

External links
Linnéa Darell at the Riksdag website

1945 births
Living people
Members of the Riksdag from the Liberals (Sweden)
Women members of the Riksdag
Members of the Riksdag 2002–2006
21st-century Swedish women politicians
Date of birth missing (living people)